Néstor Álamo (27 February 1906 – 24 March 1994) was a Spanish composer, lawyer and writer.

1906 births
Spanish composers
Spanish male composers
1994 deaths
20th-century composers
20th-century Spanish musicians
20th-century Spanish male musicians
20th-century Spanish journalists